The Academia Tehnică Militară Ferdinand I is a public university in Bucharest, Romania, founded in 1949.

Military academies of Romania
Engineering universities and colleges in Romania
Universities and colleges in Bucharest
Educational institutions established in 1949
1949 establishments in Romania